Akshaya Alshi, (Born 15 May 1999, Mumbai, Maharashtra) is an Indian Actress in the South Film Industry, Model/Actress, and International beauty pageant titleholder who was crowned Miss Cosmopolitan World’. Akshaya has reportedly attended SIIMA international film festival in Doha, Qatar and Hyderabad. She is quite busy with brand endorsements at the moment.

Akshaya Alshi

Early life and education

Akshaya Alshi was born in Mumbai, Maharashtra. She completed her schooling from Smt Sandraben Shroff Gnyan Dham School, Vapi, Gujarat. She graduated in Bachelor of Business Administration (BBA) from Jain University, Bangalore.
Later she completed her higher studies in Fashion Communication, at Istituto Marangoni in London.

Early career

Akshaya Alshi began in the fashion industry in Delhi, Mumbai, Bangalore and Malaysia. She has posed for fashion designers and Lakme fashion displays.

She was the winner of Femina Miss India Campus Princess  where she represented her university, which was held in IIM, Bangalore, Karnataka.
As a teen she participated in other contests on a national level, including Miss Queen of India and World Supermodel India.

Pageantry

Miss Glam India 
She was Miss Glam India.

Miss Cosmopolitan World
Alshi represented India in Miss Cosmopolitan World, beauty pageant in Kuala Lumpur city, Malaysia.
She won Miss Social Media in the 2nd edition of The Cosmopolitan pageant.

References

External links
 
 "Akshaya Alshi, Miss Cosmopolitan World" The Pageant Crown– 30 September
 Miss Glam India "Akshaya Alshi – "the winner of a national level pageant called Miss Glam India", Title Winner

Indian beauty pageant winners
Living people
1996 births